Salaam-e-Ishq is a 2007 Indian Hindi-language romantic drama film directed by Nikkhil Advani, it featured an ensemble cast of Salman Khan, Priyanka Chopra, Govinda, Shannon Esra, Anil Kapoor, Juhi Chawla, Akshaye Khanna, Ayesha Takia, John Abraham, Vidya Balan, Sohail Khan and Isha Koppikar in lead roles. The film weaves six love stories together thanks to the relationships of the people within it. The film was Advani's second directorial venture after Kal Ho Naa Ho (2003) and the unofficial remake of Hollywood film Love Actually (2003). The shooting for the film began in 2004 and wrapped up in 2006.

Plot

Story 1: Rahul & Kamini 
Born in Dehradun, temperamental and ambitious Kamna changes her name to Kamini Ranawat, hires Babu as her manager, and becomes one of the most sought-after heroines in Bollywood. As a publicity stunt to change her image from item queen and to get the attention of filmmaker Karan Johar, she says that she is in love with a man named Rahul. In London, a man saying that he is Rahul Khanna and poses as her childhood sweetheart and future husband. Kamna has to play along or she will not get the film deal she was looking for with Johar. This results in a dilemma for her as Rahul reveals that he loved her back when she was Kamna, and she has to choose between her career and Rahul. Kamna initially chooses her career but soon realizes that she is in love with Rahul when she cannot stop thinking about him. Kamna turns down Johar's movie offer and hunts down Rahul at Gia Bakshi and Shiven Dungarpur's wedding, where she proposes to him. Rahul and Kamna accept their love for each other and reunite.

Story 2: Gia & Shiven
Gia lives with her father Col. Bakshi and is in love with Shiven. Both are to get married shortly, but Shiven starts to get cold feet thanks to a few misleading words about marriage from his friend Juggy. He decides to disappear from her life, leaving Bakshi no alternative but to arrange Gia's marriage with Rohit Chaddha. However, Shiven remains heartbroken and cannot stop thinking about Gia. While driving one day, he accidentally hits Tehzeeb Hussain, who is walking on the road, and helps her reunite with Ashutosh Raina. As he sees the pair reunite, he realizes that he cannot let Gia go. He rushes to her wedding with Rohit and stops the wedding, professing his love for Gia. Shiven and Gia get married.

Story 3: Seema & Vinay   
Gia's sister Seema, who lives in London, has been married to Vinay Malhotra for 15 years, and they have two children. Vinay sees his life as boring and dull until a woman named Anjali comes into his life. The two start to meet and begin an affair, but while preparing to travel to India for Gia's marriage, Seema finds out about Vinay's affair, leaving her heartbroken. Vinay is left to choose between Seema and Anjali. He chooses Seema and runs to the airport as she is leaving for India with their children. Vinay apologizes to Seema, and the couple reunites.

Story 4: Ashutosh & Tehzeeb
Ashutosh is a Hindu but falls in love and marries Tehzeeb, who is Muslim, much to the chagrin of his father, who will not have anything to do with him. Tehzeeb is a TV news reporter; while travelling on an inaugural train route, the train derails. Tehzeeb survives but loses her memory and is unable to recall who Ashutosh is – and may end up leaving him and returning to her parents' home. Ashutosh takes Tehzeeb to his parents' house where they first met so that Tehzeeb can restore her memories, but he must deal with his father in order to help her. Tehzeeb is overwhelmed and runs away. She is accidentally hit by Shiven's car. Shiven calls Ashutosh, and they bring Tehzeeb to Shiven's house to rest. When Tehzeeb wakes up, she wants to leave Ashutosh and go to her family's house because she is tired of seeing him sad when she is unable to remember who he is. Ashutosh tells her that even if she cannot remember their past, the couple can form new memories together. He also tells her that without her, he has no present or future and that whatever the future brings, the couple will be able to face together. Tehzeeb and Ashutosh then reunite and resume their life together. A few years later, they are back to being the loving couple that they were before Tehzeeb's accident.

Story 5: Raju & Stephanie
Raju is a taxi driver who comes to the assistance of a white woman Stephanie, who is frantically trying to hunt down her lover Rohit Chaddha. While Raju drives her around all of Northern India searching for Rohit, he falls in love with her and drops her off to the venue where Rohit is getting ready to marry Gia. However, it turns out that Rohit does not want to marry Stephanie because he wants to marry an Indian girl and tells her to get lost. Raju slaps Rohit across the face and confesses his love for Stephanie. Stephanie confesses her love for Raju, and the couple unites.

Story 6: Ramdayal & Phoolwati
Ramdayal weds attractive Phoolwati and would like to spend some intimate moments with her, but comical circumstances prevent him from doing so. On the day they get married, Ram accidentally sets the room on fire, thus ruining his and Phoolwati's first night. One night, Ram gets kicked out of a brothel when five kids see him kissing Phoolwati. Ram and Phoolwati hide in a car but get injured when the car crashes into a house. Then, while travelling together on a train, they somehow manage to scare away the passengers from the compartment they are sharing, so they finally get their romance time.

Cast 

 Salman Khan as Rahul Khanna 
 Priyanka Chopra as Kamna/Kamini Ranawat
 Govinda as Raju
 Shannon Esra as Stephanie
 Anil Kapoor as Vinay Malhotra
 Juhi Chawla as Seema Bakshi Malhotra
 Akshaye Khanna as Shiven Dungarpur
 Ayesha Takia as Gia Bakshi 
 John Abraham as Ashutosh Raina
 Vidya Balan as Tehzeeb Hussain Raina

 Sohail Khan as Ram Dayal
 Isha Koppikar as Phoolwati
 Anjana Sukhani as Anjali Kapoor
 Tinnu Anand as Babu Vidhur: Kamini's manager
 Prem Chopra as Colonel Bakshi
 Vishal Malhotra as Juggy
 Kushal Punjabi as Rohit Chaddha
 Viju Khote as Amar Malhotra: a journalist
 Vrajesh Hirjee as Prem Singh: a journalist
 Saurabh Shukla as Dotcom Paaji

 Manoj Pahwa as Mr. Kunal Chaddha
 Kamini Khanna as Mrs. Pammi Chaddha
 Karan Johar as himself (voice-over)
 Atul Parchure as Sukhi Paaji
 Anang Desai as Mr Sumit Raina: Ashutosh's father
 Deepak Qazir as Joshi
 Smita Hai as Sweetu
 Arun Bakshi as Satpal: Sweetu's father
 Supriya Shukla as Nurse
 Leena Kapoor (cameo)

Production 
Since the plot involves various interlinked stories, the film was shot in various Indian locations of Rishikesh, Delhi, Agra, Jaipur, and Hyderabad along with abroad location at London, Australia and Sri Lanka. Vikram Phadnis worked for about two years and designed around 800 costumes for all the on-screen characters from lead actors to background dancers of the film.

Soundtrack 

The music of the film was released in 2006 at Grand Hyatt, Mumbai by T-Series. It has 7 songs composed by Shankar–Ehsaan–Loy with lyrics by Sameer. This is the second film of Nikhil Advani together with the musical trio. Their first venture Kal Ho Naa Ho (2003) had earned Shankar–Ehsaan–Loy the National Film Award for Best Music Direction. This soundtrack consisted of 7 tracks. The track "Babuji" from Aar Paar (1954) was remastered and used for the album.

Actor Akshaye Khanna who plays Shiven in the film commented on the music, saying, "Salaam-E-Ishq has the best music I have heard in the last 10 years. The album is outstanding. It is definitely Shankar-Ehsaan-Loy's best work till today. It has very unique sounds, and Sameer's lyrics are also fabulous. It is not the type which will become obsolete after a point of time. You will want to pull out its CD even after 15 years and listen to the music." Anil Kapoor, who plays Vinay, too echoed the same sentiments, saying the album was best to come out of Bollywood in a long time.

Reception 

The album was met with positive reviews from music critics. Sukanya Verma of Rediff in her 4.5 star review, remarked, "Salaam-e-Ishq is a well-designed, wholesome soundtrack with emphasis on melody, beat and innovation. Featuring 7 individual tracks, no sad versions or technically-damaged retakes. It is 7 out of 7! The musical trio succeed in getting the perfect score." Joginder Tuteja of Bollywood Hungama too gave the album a positive review, stating, "Each of the songs of Salaam-E-Ishq boasts of high quality music. There are some new sounds interspersed with the kind of music that goes well with the Bollywood scheme of things and the final result is something that is going to stay with you for many more months to come." Glamsham remarked, "The musical trio has infused different musical beats, style and concepts with élan in tracks in 'Dil Kya Kare' and 'Saiyaan Re' and has entertained with the title track. Hear it for different musical flavors and you will feel the versatility of this high-profile album and the musical flamboyance of the musical trio."

According to the Indian trade website Box Office India, with around 16,50,000 units sold, this film's soundtrack album was the year's fourth highest-selling. Rediff.com called it a "delightful soundtrack helmed by the efficient troika of Shankar-Ehsaan-Loy."

References

External links 
 

2007 films
2007 romantic drama films
2000s Hindi-language films
Indian romantic drama films
Hyperlink films
Orion Pictures films
Films shot in London
Hindi remakes of English films
Indian remakes of British films
Films directed by Nikkhil Advani